Alexander Ramsey (September 8, 1815 April 22, 1903) was an American politician. He served as a Whig and Republican over a variety of offices between the 1840s and the 1880s. He was the first Minnesota Territorial Governor.

Early years and family

Born in Hummelstown, Pennsylvania, on September 8, 1815, Alexander was the eldest of five children born to Thomas Ramsey and Elizabeth Kelker (also Kölliker or Köllker). His father was a blacksmith who committed suicide at age 42 when he went bankrupt in 1826, after signing for a note of a friend. Alexander lived with his uncle in Harrisburg, after his family split up to live with relatives. His brother was Justus Cornelius Ramsey, who served in the Minnesota Territorial Legislature.

Ramsey first studied carpentry at Lafayette College but left during his third year. He read law with Hamilton Alricks, and attended Judge John Reed's law school in Carlisle (now Penn State-Dickinson Law) in 1839. He was admitted to the Pennsylvania bar in 1839.

In 1844 Ramsey married Anna Earl Jenks, daughter of Michael Hutchinson Jenks, and they had three children. Only one daughter, Marion, survived past childhood.

Biography

Alexander Ramsey was elected from Pennsylvania as a Whig to the U.S. House of Representatives and served in the 28th and 29th congresses from March 4, 1843, to March 3, 1847. He served as the first Territorial Governor of Minnesota from June 1, 1849, to May 15, 1853, as a member of the Whig Party.

Ramsey was of Scottish and German ancestry.  In 1855, he became the mayor of St. Paul, Minnesota. Ramsey was elected the second Governor of Minnesota after statehood and served from January 2, 1860, to July 10, 1863. Ramsey is credited with being the first Union governor to commit troops during the American Civil War.  He happened to be in Washington, D.C., when fighting broke out. When he heard about the firing on Fort Sumter he went straight to the White House and offered Minnesota's services to Abraham Lincoln.

He resigned the governorship to become a U.S. Senator, having been elected to that post in 1863 as a Republican. He was re-elected in 1869 and held the office until March 3, 1875, serving in the 38th, 39th, 40th, 41st, 42nd, and 43rd congresses. He supported the Radical Republicans, who called for vigorous prosecution of the Civil War, and a military reconstruction of the South. He voted for the Impeachment of Andrew Johnson.

Ramsey called for the killing or removal of the Mdewakanton and Wahpekute Dakota from the state of Minnesota during the Dakota War of 1862. After pressing the Dakota to sell their land, he and other officials diverted the Dakota's money to themselves, leaving the Dakota without their land or the treaty money. In response, some of the Dakota attacked American settlements, resulting in the death of at least 800 civilian men, women and children, and the displacement of thousands more. In a message to the state legislature on September 9, 1862, Ramsey said: "The Sioux Indians of Minnesota must be exterminated or driven forever beyond the borders of the State," which he justified by accusing the Indians of various outrages against the white settlers and violations of their treaties. In 1863, in response to continued raids on civilian settlers, he authorized bounty payments on Dakota scalps.

Ramsey served as Secretary of War from 1879 to 1881, under President Rutherford B. Hayes. He was one of the commissioners to govern Utah from 1882 to 1886 under the Edmunds Act. The act made it illegal for polygamists to vote or hold office. Ramsey and four others were defendants in the Supreme Court case Murphy v. Ramsey, 114 U.S. 15 (1885). The Supreme Court upheld the federal law that denied polygamists the right to vote.

Legacy
 The Minnesota Historical Society preserves his home, the Alexander Ramsey House as a museum.  It was added to the National Register of Historic Places in 1969.

A number of counties, towns, parks, and schools are named after Ramsey, including:
 Ramsey County, Minnesota, 
 Ramsey County, North Dakota 
 The city of Ramsey, Minnesota 
 The city of Ramsey, Illinois, 
 Alexander Ramsey Park, located in Redwood Falls, Minnesota, is the largest municipal park in Minnesota. 
 Ramsey Park in Stillwater, Minnesota 
 Hidden River Middle School in Saint Paul, Minnesota was formerly named after him. During the 2021-2022 school year, the school was renamed after approval from the St Paul School Board; staff and students had previously called for a name change in the spring of 2021. 
 Alexander Ramsey Elementary School in Montevideo, Minnesota. 
 Justice Page Middle School in Minneapolis, Minnesota was formerly named after him when it was first founded in 1932 (Ramsey International Fine Arts Center and formerly Alexander Ramsey Junior High School). In the 2016–17 school year, a student-initiated effort to rename Ramsey Middle School resulted in renaming the school after Alan Page, the first African-American Minnesota Supreme Court justice.

He was the namesake of the Liberty Ship SS Alexander Ramsey launched in 1942.

References
 Retrieved on 2009-03-22

Alexander Ramsey U.S. Army biography
The Political Graveyard

External links

 
Biographical information,  gubernatorial records, and Ramsey's personal papers are available for research use at the Minnesota Historical Society.

  	

|-

|-

|-

|-

|-

1815 births
1903 deaths
People from Hummelstown, Pennsylvania
Methodists from Minnesota
Governors of Minnesota
Governors of Minnesota Territory
Mayors of Saint Paul, Minnesota
United States Secretaries of War
Minnesota Republicans
People of Minnesota in the American Civil War
Minnesota Whigs
Republican Party United States senators from Minnesota
Hayes administration cabinet members
Union (American Civil War) state governors
Whig Party members of the United States House of Representatives from Pennsylvania
Republican Party governors of Minnesota
19th-century American politicians
Ramsey County, Minnesota